Neville Park Loop is the eastern terminus of the 301/501 Queen streetcar line, the longest streetcar route of the Toronto Transit Commission (TTC). It is also the terminus of the 143 Beaches/Downtown express bus service. It is located at the southwest corner of Queen Street East and Nursewood Road in The Beaches neighbourhood of Toronto. It is named after the street which is just west of the loop.

Streetcars enter eastbound and loop anticlockwise to exit at Nursewood Road and turn north to Queen Street where they return westbound.

History
In 1914, the Toronto Railway Company built a wye at the eastern end of the streetcar line along Queen Street East. The wye was between Nursewood Road and Neville Park Boulevard near the eastern boundary of the old City of Toronto at the western boundary of Scarborough, Ontario. Service began to Neville Park on December 24, 1914.

In 1921, the newly created Toronto Transportation Commission took over and amalgamated existing streetcar systems within the old city limits. As part of a modernization program, the TTC decided to replace wyes with turning loops to improve operational efficiency at the end of line. (The TTC's predecessor, the Toronto Railway Company preferred wyes at the end of line.) 

On July 2, 1922, the TTC opened the Neville Park Loop to replace the old TRC wye. However, the TTC retained a portion of the old wye as a tail track south of Queen Street on Neville Park Boulevard. An eastbound streetcar could access this track only by backing in. In May 1989, the tail track was severed from the rest of the system, the severed portion of which still remains visible.

The original loop was located completely off-street at the north-west corner of Queen Street and Nursewood Road; that is, the loop did not touch Nursewood Road. However, in 1967, the TTC rebuilt the loop into Nursewood Road at a larger radius in order to accommodate two-car, multiple-unit PCC trains which operated through the loop for 10 years. The rebuilt loop had a longer off-street area to hold an entire PCC-train.

Services
Although this is the terminus for 301/501 Queen streetcars, there is no passenger access to the loop. The first westbound stop is immediately opposite on the north side of Queen Street and the last stop eastbound is at Neville Park Boulevard. The 301/501 Queen streetcars then proceed westbound, following their route, usually towards Humber Loop or Long Branch Loop. The loop is also the terminus of the 143 Beaches / Downtown premium express service, which proceeds westbound to downtown via Eastern Avenue.

References

External links

 The Great Neville Loop: article published by Transit Toronto

Toronto streetcar loops